The 1987 Bristol City Council election took place on 7 May 1987 to elect members of Bristol City Council in England. This was on the same day as other local elections. One third of seats were up for election. There was also a by-election in Clifton. There was a general but very small swing away from the Conservatives.

Ward results

The change is calculated using the 1983 election results.

Ashley

Bedminster

Bishopsworth

Brislington East

Brislington West

 The Liberals won Brislington West at the 1986 by-election and held the seat at this election.

Cabot

Clifton

Easton

Eastville

Filwood

Frome Vale

Hartcliffe

Hengrove

Hillfields

Knowle

Lawrence Hill

Lockleaze

Southville

Stockwood

St George East

St George West

Whitchurch Park

Windmill Hill

Sources
 Bristol Evening Post 8 May 1987

1987
1987 English local elections
1980s in Bristol